is a passenger railway station  located in  Higashinada-ku, Kobe, Hyōgo Prefecture, Japan. It is operated by the West Japan Railway Company (JR West).

Lines

Station layout
The station consists of two island platforms connected by an elevated station building; however, only the inner tracks are used, with the outer tracks reserved for passing express trains. The station has a Midori no Madoguchi staffed ticket office.

Platforms

Adjacent stations

History
Settsu-Motoyama Station opened on 25 December 1935. With the privatization of the Japan National Railways (JNR) on 1 April 1987, the station came under the aegis of the West Japan Railway Company.

Station numbering was introduced to the station in March 2018 with Settsu-Motoyama being assigned station number JR-A56.

Passenger statistics
In fiscal 2019, the station was used by an average of 22,028 passengers daily

Surrounding area
Konan University
Okamoto Station (Hyōgo) - 4 minutes walk. 
Kobe Pharmaceutical University 
Okamoto Bairin Park

See also
List of railway stations in Japan

References

External links 

 Settsu-Motoyama Station from JR-Odekake.net 

Railway stations in Japan opened in 1935
Tōkaidō Main Line
Railway stations in Kobe